KVSN-DT (channel 48) is a television station licensed to Pueblo, Colorado, United States, serving the Colorado Springs area as an affiliate of the Spanish-language Univision network. It is owned by Entravision Communications alongside low-power, Class A UniMás affiliate KGHB-CD (channel 27, also licensed to Pueblo). KVSN's transmitter is located on Cheyenne Mountain.

Although identifying as a separate station in its own right, KVSN is considered a semi-satellite of Boulder-licensed KCEC (channel 14, owned by TelevisaUnivision USA but operated by Entravision under a local marketing agreement [LMA]). As such, it simulcasts all Univision programming as provided through KCEC, and the two stations share a website. However, KVSN airs separate commercial inserts and legal identifications. Local newscasts, produced by KCEC and branded as Noticias Univision Colorado, are simulcast on both stations. Aside from the transmitter, KVSN does not maintain any facilities in Pueblo or Colorado Springs. Master control and internal operations are based at KCEC's studios on Mile High Stadium West Circle in Denver.

History

On April 10, 2007, the Federal Communications Commission (FCC) granted a three-year construction permit to Entravision to build a new analog television station to serve the Pueblo–Colorado Springs market on channel 48. It was given the call sign KVSN. Shortly after the permit was granted, Entravision opted to build KVSN as a digital-only station and filed an application in April 2008. KVSN commenced operations under automatic Program Test Authority on March 2, 2009, replacing Class A LPTV station KGHB-CA. Its license was granted on June 5, 2009.

Technical information

Subchannels
The station's digital signal is multiplexed:

References

External links

Entravision official site

VSN-DT
Television channels and stations established in 2009
2009 establishments in Colorado
Univision network affiliates
LATV affiliates
TBD (TV network) affiliates
True Crime Network affiliates
VSN-DT
Entravision Communications stations